Wren was the major brand name for a series of 5.25-inch hard disks produced by Control Data Corporation (CDC) for the microcomputer market during the 1980s. The brand evolved through seven major versions, I through VII, using custom attachments but later adapting SCSI and IDE. Other brands included the Elite 5.25-inch 5,400 RPM drives, the Swift 3.5-inch series and the relatively rare Sabre 8-inch drives. 

Wren was a major brand during the 1980s, especially in the high-end market where its 5,400 RPM voice-coil–based technology gave them a performance edge. However, by the 1980s, CDC was in the middle of selling itself off leading to its eventual disappearance. The drive division was spun off as Imprimis in 1986. Seagate Technology, who had been lagging Wren and Elite in the high-performance market, purchased Imprimis and rebranded the entire line as Seagate in 1989.

External links
 CDC Hard Disk Drives

Hard disk computer storage
Control Data Corporation hardware